Leonard "Nardu" Farrugia (born 25 November 1956 in Kirkop) is a Maltese former footballer. He played for Kirkop United, St George's and Valletta. Farrugia was capped eighteen times for the Malta national football team and scored twice.

Club career

Farrugia started playing football for his hometown team Kirkop United. His father Clement founded the club and was its first president. Leonard was loaned to St George's before signing for Valletta in 1976.

Valletta

Farrugia scored the only goal in the 1976–77 Maltese FA Trophy final against Floriana. He finished top scorer of the league in
the 1977–78, 1979–80, and 1984–85 seasons. In 1985 he won the Maltese Player of the Year.

International career

In 1978 Farrugia made his debut for Malta in a 1–0 victory against Tunisia. He scored against Portugal and Sweden.

Farrugia was injured by a tackle from Antonio Cabrini in a friendly game against Italy. He missed the rest of the season and was forced to retire after being substituted against Birkirkara the following season.

International goals
"Score" represents the score in the match after Farrugia's goal.

Honours and achievements

Player 

Valletta

Premier League: 1977–78, 1979–80, 1983–84
FA Trophy: 1976–77, 1977–78

Individual 

 Maltese Player of the Year: 1985

References

External links

Leonard Farruglia Valletta FC's Hall of Fame profile
Leonard Farruglia Profile on National-Football-Teams.com

1956 births
Living people
Maltese footballers
Malta international footballers
Association football forwards
Maltese Premier League players
St. George's F.C. players
Valletta F.C. players
People from Kirkop